In mathematics, the exterior algebra, or Grassmann algebra, named after Hermann Grassmann, is an algebra that uses the exterior product or wedge product as its multiplication. In mathematics, the exterior product or wedge product of vectors is an algebraic construction used in geometry to study areas, volumes, and their higher-dimensional analogues. The magnitude of  can be interpreted as the area of the parallelogram with sides  and  which in three dimensions can also be computed using the cross product of the two vectors. More generally, all parallel plane surfaces with the same orientation and area have the same bivector as a measure of their oriented area. Like the cross product, the exterior product is anticommutative, meaning that  for all vectors  and  but, unlike the cross product, the exterior product is associative.

When regarded in this manner, the exterior product of two vectors is called a 2-blade.  More generally, the exterior product of any number k of vectors can be defined and is sometimes called a k-blade.  It lives in a space known as the k-th exterior power.  The magnitude of the resulting k-blade is the oriented hypervolume of the k-dimensional parallelotope whose edges are the given vectors, just as the magnitude of the scalar triple product of vectors in three dimensions gives the volume of the parallelepiped generated by those vectors.

The exterior algebra provides an algebraic setting in which to answer geometric questions.  For instance, blades have a concrete geometric interpretation, and objects in the exterior algebra can be manipulated according to a set of unambiguous rules.  The exterior algebra contains objects that are not only k-blades, but sums of k-blades; such a sum is called a k-vector.  The k-blades, because they are simple products of vectors, are called the simple elements of the algebra.  The rank of any k-vector is defined to be the smallest number of simple elements of which it is a sum.  The exterior product extends to the full exterior algebra, so that it makes sense to multiply any two elements of the algebra.  Equipped with this product, the exterior algebra is an associative algebra, which means that  for any elements   The k-vectors have degree k, meaning that they are sums of products of k vectors.  When elements of different degrees are multiplied, the degrees add like multiplication of polynomials.  This means that the exterior algebra is a graded algebra.

The definition of the exterior algebra makes sense for spaces not just of geometric vectors, but of other vector-like objects such as vector fields or functions.  In full generality, the exterior algebra can be defined for modules over a commutative ring, and for other structures of interest in abstract algebra.  It is one of these more general constructions where the exterior algebra finds one of its most important applications, where it appears as the algebra of differential forms that is fundamental in areas that use differential geometry.  The exterior algebra also has many algebraic properties that make it a convenient tool in algebra itself.  The association of the exterior algebra to a vector space is a type of functor on vector spaces, which means that it is compatible in a certain way with linear transformations of vector spaces.  The exterior algebra is one example of a bialgebra, meaning that its dual space also possesses a product, and this dual product is compatible with the exterior product.  This dual algebra is precisely the algebra of alternating multilinear forms,  and the pairing between the exterior algebra and its dual is given by the interior product.

Motivating examples

The first two examples assume a metric tensor field and an orientation; the third example does not assume either.

Areas in the plane

The Cartesian plane  is a real vector space equipped with a basis consisting of a pair of unit vectors

 with the orientation  and with the metric 

Suppose that

are a pair of given vectors in  written in components.  There is a unique parallelogram having v and w as two of its sides.  The area of this parallelogram is given by the standard determinant formula:

Consider now the exterior product of v and w:

where the first step uses the distributive law for the exterior product, and the last uses the fact that the exterior product is alternating, and in particular   (The fact that the exterior product is alternating also forces ) Note that the coefficient in this last expression is precisely the determinant of the matrix .  The fact that this may be positive or negative has the intuitive meaning that v and w may be oriented in a counterclockwise or clockwise sense as the vertices of the parallelogram they define.  Such an area is called the signed area of the parallelogram: the absolute value of the signed area is the ordinary area, and the sign determines its orientation.

The fact that this coefficient is the signed area is not an accident.  In fact, it is relatively easy to see that the exterior product should be related to the signed area if one tries to axiomatize this area as an algebraic construct.  In detail, if  denotes the signed area of the parallelogram of which the pair of vectors v and w form two adjacent sides, then A must satisfy the following properties:
  for any real numbers r and s, since rescaling either of the sides rescales the area by the same amount (and reversing the direction of one of the sides reverses the orientation of the parallelogram).
 , since the area of the degenerate parallelogram determined by v (i.e., a line segment) is zero.
 , since interchanging the roles of v and w reverses the orientation of the parallelogram.
  for any real number r, since adding a multiple of w to v affects neither the base nor the height of the parallelogram and consequently preserves its area.
 , since the area of the unit square is one.

With the exception of the last property, the exterior product of two vectors satisfies the same properties as the area.  In a certain sense, the exterior product generalizes the final property by allowing the area of a parallelogram to be compared to that of any chosen parallelogram in a parallel plane (here, the one with sides e1 and e2).  In other words, the exterior product provides a basis-independent formulation of area.

Cross and triple products
For vectors in a 3-dimensional oriented vector space with a bilinear scalar product, the exterior algebra is closely related to the cross product and triple product.  Using a standard basis , the exterior product of a pair of vectors

and

is

where  is a basis for the three-dimensional space   The coefficients above are the same as those in the usual definition of the cross product of vectors in three dimensions with a given orientation, the only differences being that the exterior product is not an ordinary vector, but instead is a 2-vector, and that the exterior product does not depend on the choice of orientation .

Bringing in a third vector

the exterior product of three vectors is

where  is the basis vector for the one-dimensional space   The scalar coefficient is the triple product of the three vectors.

The cross product and triple product in a three dimensional Euclidean vector space each admit both geometric and algebraic interpretations, via Hodge star duality.  The cross product  can be interpreted as a vector which is perpendicular to both u and v and whose magnitude is equal to the area of the parallelogram determined by the two vectors.  It can also be interpreted as the vector consisting of the minors of the matrix with columns u and v.  The triple product of u, v, and w is a signed scalar representing a geometric oriented volume.  Algebraically, it is the determinant of the matrix with columns u, v, and w.  The exterior product in three dimensions allows for similar interpretations: it, too, can be identified with oriented lines, areas, volumes, etc., that are spanned by one, two or more vectors.  The exterior product generalizes these geometric notions to all vector spaces and to any number of dimensions, even in the absence of a scalar product.

Electromagnetic field
In Einstein's theories of relativity, the electromagnetic field is generally given as a differential 2-form  in 4-space or as the equivalent alternating tensor field  the electromagnetic tensor.  Then  or the equivalent Bianchi identity 
None of this requires a metric.

Adding the Lorentz metric and an orientation provides the Hodge star operator  and thus makes it possible to define  or the equivalent tensor divergence  where

Formal definitions and algebraic properties
The ideal I contains the ideal J generated by elements of the form  and these ideals coincide if  (if  these ideals are different except for the zero vector space).

So,

is an associative algebra.
Its multiplication is called the exterior product, and denoted .

The word canonical is also commonly used in place of natural.

Alternating product

hence

More generally, if σ is a permutation of the integers , and x1, x2, ..., xk are elements of V, it follows that

where sgn(σ) is the signature of the permutation σ.

Together with the distributive property of the exterior product, one further generalization is that if and only if  is a linearly dependent set of vectors, then

Exterior power

The kth exterior power of V, denoted  is the vector subspace of  spanned by elements of the form

If  then α is said to be a k-vector. If, furthermore, α can be expressed as an exterior product of k elements of V, then α is said to be decomposable. For example, in  the following 2-vector is not decomposable:

(This is a symplectic form, since .)

Basis and dimension

is a basis for   The reason is the following: given any exterior product of the form

every vector  can be written as a linear combination of the basis vectors ; using the bilinearity of the exterior product, this can be expanded to a linear combination of exterior products of those basis vectors.  Any exterior product in which the same basis vector appears more than once is zero; any exterior product in which the basis vectors do not appear in the proper order can be reordered, changing the sign whenever two basis vectors change places.  In general, the resulting coefficients of the basis -vectors can be computed as the minors of the matrix that describes the vectors  in terms of the basis .

Any element of the exterior algebra can be written as a sum of -vectors.  Hence, as a vector space the exterior algebra is a direct sum

(where by convention  the field underlying , and ), and therefore its dimension is equal to the sum of the binomial coefficients, which is 2.

Rank of a k-vector

If  then it is possible to express α as a linear combination of decomposable k-vectors:

where each α(i) is decomposable, say

The rank of the k-vector α is the minimal number of decomposable k-vectors in such an expansion of α.  This is similar to the notion of tensor rank.

Rank is particularly important in the study of 2-vectors  .  The rank of a 2-vector α can be identified with half the rank of the matrix of coefficients of α in a basis.  Thus if ei is a basis for V, then α can be expressed uniquely as

where  (the matrix of coefficients is skew-symmetric).  The rank of the matrix aij is therefore even, and is twice the rank of the form α.

In characteristic 0, the 2-vector α has rank p if and only if

 and

Graded structure
The exterior product of a k-vector with a p-vector is a -vector, once again invoking bilinearity.  As a consequence, the direct sum decomposition of the preceding section

gives the exterior algebra the additional structure of a graded algebra, that is

Moreover, if  is the base field, we have

 and 

The exterior product is graded anticommutative, meaning that if  and  then

In addition to studying the graded structure on the exterior algebra,  studies additional graded structures on exterior algebras, such as those on the exterior algebra of a graded module (a module that already carries its own gradation).

Universal property
Let  be a vector space over the field . Formally,  is the "most general" algebra in which these rules hold for the multiplication, in the sense that any unital associative -algebra containing  with alternating multiplication on  must contain a homomorphic image of   In other words, the exterior algebra has the following universal property:

(and use  as the symbol for multiplication in ).  It is then straightforward to show that  contains  and satisfies the above universal property.

As a consequence of this construction, the operation of assigning to a vector space  its exterior algebra  is a functor from the category of vector spaces to the category of algebras.

Rather than defining  first and then identifying the exterior powers  as certain subspaces, one may alternatively define the spaces  first and then combine them to form the algebra   This approach is often used in differential geometry and is described in the next section.

Generalizations

Given a commutative ring R and an R-module M, we can define the exterior algebra  just as above, as a suitable quotient of the tensor algebra T(M). It will satisfy the analogous universal property. Many of the properties of  also require that M be a projective module. Where finite dimensionality is used, the properties further require that M be finitely generated and projective.

Exterior algebras of vector bundles are frequently considered in geometry and topology.  There are no essential differences between the algebraic properties of the exterior algebra of finite-dimensional vector bundles and those of the exterior algebra of finitely generated projective modules, by the Serre–Swan theorem.  More general exterior algebras can be defined for sheaves of modules.

Alternating tensor algebra
If K is a field of characteristic 0, then the exterior algebra of a vector space V over K can be canonically identified with the vector subspace of T(V) consisting of antisymmetric tensors.  Recall that the exterior algebra is the quotient of T(V) by the ideal I generated by elements of the form .

Let Tr(V) be the space of homogeneous tensors of degree r.  This is spanned by decomposable tensors

The antisymmetrization (or sometimes the skew-symmetrization) of a decomposable tensor is defined by

where the sum is taken over the symmetric group of permutations on the symbols  This extends by linearity and homogeneity to an operation, also denoted by Alt, on the full tensor algebra T(V).  The image Alt(T(V)) is the alternating tensor algebra, denoted A(V). This is a vector subspace of T(V), and it inherits the structure of a graded vector space from that on T(V).  It carries an associative graded product  defined by

Although this product differs from the tensor product, the kernel of Alt is precisely the ideal I (again, assuming that K has characteristic 0), and there is a canonical isomorphism

Index notation
Suppose that V has finite dimension n, and that a basis  of V is given.  Then any alternating tensor  can be written in index notation as

where ti1⋅⋅⋅ir is completely antisymmetric in its indices.

The exterior product of two alternating tensors t and s of ranks r and p is given by

The components of this tensor are precisely the skew part of the components of the tensor product , denoted by square brackets on the indices:

The interior product may also be described in index notation as follows. Let  be an antisymmetric tensor of rank r.

where n is the dimension of V.

Duality

Alternating operators

Given two vector spaces V and X and a natural number k, an alternating operator from Vk to X is a multilinear map

such that whenever v1, ..., vk are linearly dependent vectors in V, then

The map

which associates to  vectors from  their exterior product, i.e. their corresponding -vector, is also alternating.  In fact, this map is the "most general" alternating operator defined on  given any other alternating operator  there exists a unique linear map  with   This universal property characterizes the space  and can serve as its definition.

Alternating multilinear forms 

The above discussion specializes to the case when , the base field.  In this case an alternating multilinear function

is called an alternating multilinear form. The set of all alternating multilinear forms is a vector space, as the sum of two such maps, or the product of such a map with a scalar, is again alternating.

Under such identification, the exterior product takes a concrete form: it produces a new anti-symmetric map from two given ones. As in the case of tensor products of multilinear maps, the number of variables of their exterior product is the sum of the numbers of their variables. Depending on the choice of identification of elements of exterior power with multilinear forms, the exterior product is defined as

or as

where, if the characteristic of the base field K is 0, the alternation Alt of a multilinear map is defined to be the average of the sign-adjusted values over all the permutations of its variables:

When the field K has finite characteristic, an equivalent version of the second expression without any factorials or any constants is well-defined:

Interior product

Suppose that V is finite-dimensional.  If V∗ denotes the dual space to the vector space V, then for each , it is possible to define an antiderivation on the algebra 

This derivation is called the interior product with α, or sometimes the insertion operator, or contraction by α.

Suppose that   Then w is a multilinear mapping of V∗ to K, so it is defined by its values on the k-fold Cartesian product .  If u1, u2, ..., uk−1 are  elements of V∗, then define

Additionally, let  whenever f is a pure scalar (i.e., belonging to ).

Axiomatic characterization and properties
The interior product satisfies the following properties:

 For each k and each ,  (By convention)
 If v is an element of V, then  is the dual pairing between elements of V and elements of V∗.
 For each , iα is a graded derivation of degree −1:

These three properties are sufficient to characterize the interior product as well as define it in the general infinite-dimensional case.

Further properties of the interior product include:

Hodge duality

Suppose that V has finite dimension n.  Then the interior product induces a canonical isomorphism of vector spaces

by the recursive definition

In the geometrical setting, a non-zero element of the top exterior power  (which is a one-dimensional vector space) is sometimes called a volume form (or orientation form, although this term may sometimes lead to ambiguity).  The name orientation form comes from the fact that a choice of preferred top element determines an orientation of the whole exterior algebra, since it is tantamount to fixing an ordered basis of the vector space.  Relative to the preferred volume form σ, the isomorphism is given explicitly by

If, in addition to a volume form, the vector space V is equipped with an inner product identifying V with V∗, then the resulting isomorphism is called the Hodge star operator, which maps an element to its Hodge dual:

In most applications, the volume form is compatible with the inner product in the sense that it is an exterior product of an orthonormal basis of V.  In this case,

where id is the identity mapping, and the inner product has metric signature  — p pluses and q minuses.

Inner product
On decomposable k-vectors,

the determinant of the matrix of inner products.  In the special case , the inner product is the square norm of the k-vector, given by the determinant of the Gramian matrix .  This is then extended bilinearly (or sesquilinearly in the complex case) to a non-degenerate inner product on   If ei, form an orthonormal basis of V, then the vectors of the form

With respect to the inner product, exterior multiplication and the interior product are mutually adjoint.

where  is the musical isomorphism, the linear functional defined by

for all .  This property completely characterizes the inner product on the exterior algebra.

where now  is the dual l-vector defined by

for all

Bialgebra structure
There is a correspondence between the graded dual of the graded algebra  and alternating multilinear forms on V.  The exterior algebra (as well as the symmetric algebra) inherits a bialgebra structure, and, indeed, a Hopf algebra structure, from the tensor algebra.  See the article on tensor algebras for a detailed treatment of the topic.

The exterior product of multilinear forms defined above is dual to a coproduct defined on  giving the structure of a coalgebra.  The coproduct is a linear function  which is given by

on elements v∈V.  The symbol 1 stands for the unit element of the field K.  Recall that  so that the above really does lie in  This definition of the coproduct is lifted to the full space  by (linear) homomorphism. 
The correct form of this homomorphism is not what one might naively write, but has to be the one carefully defined in the coalgebra article.  In this case, one obtains

Expanding this out in detail, one obtains the following expression on decomposable elements:

where the second summation is taken over all -shuffles.  The above is written with a notational trick, to keep track of the field element 1: the trick is to write  and this is shuffled into various locations during the expansion of the sum over shuffles.  The shuffle follows directly from the first axiom of a co-algebra: the relative order of the elements  is preserved in the riffle shuffle: the riffle shuffle merely splits the ordered sequence into two ordered sequences, one on the left, and one on the right.

Observe that the coproduct preserves the grading of the algebra.  Extending to the full space  one has

The tensor symbol ⊗ used in this section should be understood with some caution: it is not the same tensor symbol as the one being used in the definition of the alternating product. This distinction is developed in greater detail in the article on tensor algebras. Here, there is much less of a problem, in that the alternating product ∧ clearly corresponds to multiplication in the bialgebra, leaving the symbol ⊗ free for use in the definition of the bialgebra. In practice, this presents no particular problem, as long as one avoids the fatal trap of replacing alternating sums of ⊗ by the wedge symbol, with one exception. One can construct an alternating product from ⊗, with the understanding that it works in a different space. Immediately below, an example is given: the alternating product for the dual space can be given in terms of the coproduct. The construction of the bialgebra here parallels the construction in the tensor algebra article almost exactly, except for the need to correctly track the alternating signs for the exterior algebra.

In terms of the coproduct, the exterior product on the dual space is just the graded dual of the coproduct:

where the tensor product on the right-hand side is of multilinear linear maps (extended by zero on elements of incompatible homogeneous degree: more precisely, where ε is the counit, as defined presently).

The counit is the homomorphism  that returns the 0-graded component of its argument.  The coproduct and counit, along with the exterior product, define the structure of a bialgebra on the exterior algebra.

With an antipode defined on homogeneous elements by  the exterior algebra is furthermore a Hopf algebra.

Functoriality
Then, by the universal property, there exists a unique homomorphism of graded algebras

such that

In particular,  preserves homogeneous degree.

Let

The components of the transformation  relative to a basis of V and W is the matrix of  minors of f.  In particular, if  and V is of finite dimension n, then  is a mapping of a one-dimensional vector space  to itself, and is therefore given by a scalar: the determinant of f.

Exactness
If  is a short exact sequence of vector spaces, then

is an exact sequence of graded vector spaces, as is

Direct sums 
In particular, the exterior algebra of a direct sum is isomorphic to the tensor product of the exterior algebras:

This is a graded isomorphism; i.e.,

In greater generality, for a short exact sequence of vector spaces  there is a natural filtration 

The corresponding quotients admit a natural isomorphism

 given by 

In particular, if U is 1-dimensional then

is exact, and if W is 1-dimensional then

is exact.

Applications

Linear algebra
In applications to linear algebra, the exterior product provides an abstract algebraic manner for describing the determinant and the minors of a matrix.  For instance, it is well known that the determinant of a square matrix is equal to the volume of the parallelotope whose sides are the columns of the matrix (with a sign to track orientation).  This suggests that the determinant can be defined in terms of the exterior product of the column vectors.  Likewise, the  minors of a matrix can be defined by looking at the exterior products of column vectors chosen k at a time.  These ideas can be extended not just to matrices but to linear transformations as well: the determinant of a linear transformation is the factor by which it scales the oriented volume of any given reference parallelotope.  So the determinant of a linear transformation can be defined in terms of what the transformation does to the top exterior power.  The action of a transformation on the lesser exterior powers gives a basis-independent way to talk about the minors of the transformation.

Technical details: Definitions
Let  be an n-dimensional vector space over field  with basis 
More generally, we can define  on simple tensors by  i.e. choose k components on which A would act, then sum up all results obtained from different choices. If  define   Since  is 1-dimensional with basis  we can identify  with the unique number  satisfying 
 For  define the exterior transpose  to be the unique operator satisfying  for any  and 
 For  define     These are equivalent to the previous definitions.

Basic properties
All results obtained from other definitions of the determinant, trace and adjoint can be obtained from this definition (since these definitions are equivalent).  Here are some basic properties related to these new definitions:

  is -linear.
 
 For all   In particular,  and hence 
  In particular, 
 
 
 The characteristic polynomial  of  can be given by  Similarly,

Leverrier's algorithm

 are the coefficients of the  terms in the characteristic polynomial.
Set 
For

Physics

In physics, many quantities are naturally represented by alternating operators.  For example, if the motion of a charged particle is described by velocity and acceleration vectors in four-dimensional spacetime, then normalization of the velocity vector requires that the electromagnetic force must be an alternating operator on the velocity.  Its six degrees of freedom are identified with the electric and magnetic fields.

Linear geometry
The decomposable k-vectors have geometric interpretations: the bivector  represents the plane spanned by the vectors, "weighted" with a number, given by the area of the oriented parallelogram with sides u and v.  Analogously, the 3-vector  represents the spanned 3-space weighted by the volume of the oriented parallelepiped with edges u, v, and w.

Projective geometry
Decomposable k-vectors in  correspond to weighted k-dimensional linear subspaces of V.  In particular, the Grassmannian of k-dimensional subspaces of V, denoted Grk(V), can be naturally identified with an algebraic subvariety of the projective space   This is called the Plücker embedding.

Differential geometry
The exterior algebra has notable applications in differential geometry, where it is used to define differential forms. Differential forms are mathematical objects that evaluate the length of vectors, areas of parallelograms, and volumes of higher-dimensional bodies, so they can be integrated over curves, surfaces and higher dimensional manifolds in a way that generalizes the line integrals and surface integrals from calculus.  A differential form at a point of a differentiable manifold is an alternating multilinear form on the tangent space at the point.  Equivalently, a differential form of degree k is a linear functional on the k-th exterior power of the tangent space.  As a consequence, the exterior product of multilinear forms defines a natural exterior product for differential forms.  Differential forms play a major role in diverse areas of differential geometry.

An alternate approach defines differential forms in terms of germs of functions.

In particular, the exterior derivative gives the exterior algebra of differential forms on a manifold the structure of a differential graded algebra.  The exterior derivative commutes with pullback along smooth mappings between manifolds, and it is therefore a natural differential operator.  The exterior algebra of differential forms, equipped with the exterior derivative, is a cochain complex whose cohomology is called the de Rham cohomology of the underlying manifold and plays a vital role in the algebraic topology of differentiable manifolds.

Representation theory
In representation theory, the exterior algebra is one of the two fundamental Schur functors on the category of vector spaces, the other being the symmetric algebra.  Together, these constructions are used to generate the irreducible representations of the general linear group; see fundamental representation.

Superspace
The exterior algebra over the complex numbers is the archetypal example of a superalgebra, which plays a fundamental role in physical theories pertaining to fermions and supersymmetry.  A single element of the exterior algebra is called a supernumber or Grassmann number.  The exterior algebra itself is then just a one-dimensional superspace: it is just the set of all of the points in the exterior algebra.  The topology on this space is essentially the weak topology, the open sets being the cylinder sets.  An -dimensional superspace is just the -fold product of exterior algebras.

Lie algebra homology
Let L be a Lie algebra over a field K, then it is possible to define the structure of a chain complex on the exterior algebra of L.  This is a K-linear mapping

defined on decomposable elements by

The Jacobi identity holds if and only if , and so this is a necessary and sufficient condition for an anticommutative nonassociative algebra L to be a Lie algebra.  Moreover, in that case  is a chain complex with boundary operator ∂.  The homology associated to this complex is the Lie algebra homology.

Homological algebra
The exterior algebra is the main ingredient in the construction of the Koszul complex, a fundamental object in homological algebra.

History 
The exterior algebra was first introduced by Hermann Grassmann in 1844 under the blanket term of Ausdehnungslehre, or Theory of Extension.
This referred more generally to an algebraic (or axiomatic) theory of extended quantities and was one of the early precursors to the modern notion of a vector space.  Saint-Venant also published similar ideas of exterior calculus for which he claimed priority over Grassmann.

The algebra itself was built from a set of rules, or axioms, capturing the formal aspects of Cayley and Sylvester's theory of multivectors.  It was thus a calculus, much like the propositional calculus, except focused exclusively on the task of formal reasoning in geometrical terms.
In particular, this new development allowed for an axiomatic characterization of dimension, a property that had previously only been examined from the coordinate point of view.

The import of this new theory of vectors and multivectors was lost to mid 19th century mathematicians,
until being thoroughly vetted by Giuseppe Peano in 1888.  Peano's work also remained somewhat obscure until the turn of the century, when the subject was unified by members of the French geometry school (notably Henri Poincaré, Élie Cartan, and Gaston Darboux) who applied Grassmann's ideas to the calculus of differential forms.

A short while later, Alfred North Whitehead, borrowing from the ideas of Peano and Grassmann, introduced his universal algebra.  This then paved the way for the 20th century developments of abstract algebra by placing the axiomatic notion of an algebraic system on a firm logical footing.

See also

Alternating algebra
Exterior calculus identities
Clifford algebra, a generalization of exterior algebra using a nonzero quadratic form
Geometric algebra
Koszul complex
Multilinear algebra
Symmetric algebra, the symmetric analog
Tensor algebra
Weyl algebra, a quantum deformation of the symmetric algebra by a symplectic form

Notes

References

Mathematical references
 
 Includes a treatment of alternating tensors and alternating forms, as well as a detailed discussion of Hodge duality from the perspective adopted in this article.
 
 This is the main mathematical reference for the article.  It introduces the exterior algebra of a module over a commutative ring (although this article specializes primarily to the case when the ring is a field), including a discussion of the universal property, functoriality, duality, and the bialgebra structure.  See §III.7 and §III.11.
 
 This book contains applications of exterior algebras to problems in partial differential equations.  Rank and related concepts are developed in the early chapters.
 
 Chapter XVI sections 6–10 give a more elementary account of the exterior algebra, including duality, determinants and minors, and alternating forms.
 
 Contains a classical treatment of the exterior algebra as alternating tensors, and applications to differential geometry.

Historical references
 
 
 
  (The Linear Extension Theory – A new Branch of Mathematics) alternative reference
 
 ; .

Other references and further reading

 
 An introduction to the exterior algebra, and geometric algebra, with a focus on applications.  Also includes a history section and bibliography.
 
 Includes applications of the exterior algebra to differential forms, specifically focused on integration and Stokes's theorem.  The notation  in this text is used to mean the space of alternating k-forms on V; i.e., for Spivak  is what this article would call   Spivak discusses this in Addendum 4.
 
 Includes an elementary treatment of the axiomatization of determinants as signed areas, volumes, and higher-dimensional volumes.
 
 
 This textbook in multivariate calculus introduces the exterior algebra of differential forms adroitly into the calculus sequence for colleges.
 
 An introduction to the coordinate-free approach in basic finite-dimensional linear algebra, using exterior products.
 
 Chapter 10: The Exterior Product and Exterior Algebras
 "The Grassmann method in projective geometry" A compilation of English translations of three notes by Cesare Burali-Forti on the application of exterior algebra to projective geometry
 C. Burali-Forti, "Introduction to Differential Geometry, following the method of H. Grassmann" An English translation of an early book on the geometric applications of exterior algebras
 "Mechanics, according to the principles of the theory of extension" An English translation of one Grassmann's papers on the applications of exterior algebra

Algebras
Multilinear algebra
Differential forms